Scott Walker: 30 Century Man is a 2006 documentary film about Scott Walker. The film gets its title from the Scott 3 song "30 Century Man". It is directed and co-produced by Stephen Kijak, with Grant Gee serving as director of photography. It charts Walker's career in music, with a focus on his songwriting, and features exclusive footage of recording sessions for his most recent album, The Drift including a memorable sequence in which Walker oversees the recording of the punching of a joint of pork, for the percussion on the song Clara.  Rock legend David Bowie, who often professed to having been inspired by Walker, acted as executive producer of the film. Actor Gale Harold is one of the associate producers.

The film received its world premiere at the London Film Festival on 31 October 2006 and debuted internationally at the 2007 Berlin International Film Festival in the Panorama.  It was released later in 2007 in cinemas and on DVD in the UK by Verve Pictures and went on to become one of the most critically acclaimed documentaries released there that year. It had its US premiere at the South by Southwest (SXSW) Film Festival in March 2007.  Other film festivals that have screened the film include the Sydney Film Festival, Tribeca Film Festival, HotDocs, Melbourne International Film Festival, Viennale, Seattle International Film Festival, and the Hong Kong International Film Festival.

In addition to Walker himself, interviewees in the film include David Bowie, Radiohead, Jarvis Cocker, Brian Eno, Damon Albarn, Marc Almond, Alison Goldfrapp, Sting, Dot Allison, Simon Raymonde, Richard Hawley, Rob Ellis, Cathal Coughlan, Johnny Marr, Gavin Friday, Lulu, Peter Olliff, Angela Morley (arranger of Walker's sixties' recordings as Wally Stott), Ute Lemper, Ed Bicknell, Evan Parker, Hector Zazou, Mo Foster, Phil Sheppard, and Peter Walsh.

The film is produced by Oscar-winning producer Mia Bays, marking her debut in documentary and feature film production. She was nominated for a 2008 BAFTA award (The Carl Foreman Award for Special Achievement by a British Writer, Director or Producer in Their First Feature Film) for her work on the film.

An edited version of the film was used for the BBC series Imagine. It was introduced by Alan Yentob.

In early 2008 Madman Films released the film on DVD in Australia and Avalon films released the film on DVD in Spain. Oscilloscope Laboratories, a distribution company founded by Adam Yauch of Beastie Boys, acquired the distribution rights in North America after the film's US release was delayed. It began another critically acclaimed theatrical run, this time in select US cities, and was released on DVD in North America in Summer 2009.

Soundtrack

Music Inspired by the Film Scott Walker: 30 Century Man was released on 26 May 2009 to promote the US release of the film. Instead of a compilation of Walker's material the album was conceived as a tribute album. The album was released on Lakeshore Records

References

External links
30 Century Man – the filmmakers' blog
Scott Walker: 30 Century Man (full video) on Topic.com
Scott Walker: 30 Century Man EPK for 4AD – Scenes from the documentary

Missing In Action Films Ltd – production company
Verve Pictures – UK distributor
Moviehouse Entertainment – international distributor
club.kingsnake.com: Review of Scott Walker: 30 Century Man; interview with Stephen Kijak
Empire Magazine: review
Time Out London: review
Sight & Sound: review
Kevchino Interview with Stephen Kijak on Scott Walker: 30 Century Man

2006 films
British documentary films
Documentary films about music and musicians
Films directed by Stephen Kijak
Scott Walker (singer)
2000s English-language films
2000s British films